Riley Technologies LLC is an American auto racing constructor and team specializing in the design and manufacture of complete race cars, as well as prototype development for racing and manufacturing applications.

In 2001, Bob Riley and son Bill, formerly of Riley & Scott, formed Riley Technologies.  The company moved their headquarters to Mooresville, North Carolina in late 2006.

Daytona Prototypes
Riley Technologies was the leading constructor of the Daytona Prototype chassis for the Grand-Am Rolex Sports Car Series. The Riley chassis was dominant in terms of both numbers of cars on the grid and results.

Riley chassis have won seven 24 Hours of Daytona races with different engines, the 2005 race was won by the SunTrust Racing Pontiac-Riley and 2006, 2007, and 2008 victories went to Chip Ganassi Racing Lexus powered Rileys. The 2009 race was won by a Brumos Racing Porsche powered Riley. In the 2010 race, another Porsche-powered Mark XI from Action Express Racing won. The 2011 race was again won by Chip Ganassi Racing, this time with a BMW engine.

When the United SportsCar Championship was created in 2014, Riley continued as Daytona Prototype supplier, with Gen3 rules adopted to make the cars competitive versus the former ALMS LMP2 cars. The company supplied the Ganassi, GAINSCO/Bob Stallings, Shank and Starworks teams. Ganassi became the only full-time team in 2015, and no full-time entry used Riley chassis in 2016.

In 2017, Riley became one of the four LMP2 and DPi chassis manufacturers with the Riley-Multimatic MkXXX. The car was developed in partnership with Multimatic. Multimatic would take charge over the carbon fiber tub, vehicular bodywork and aerodynamic aspects of the car, whilst Riley would design and manufacture the majority of the mechanical components on the Mk30, including the suspension and assembly of the car.

On 15 June 2017, Multimatic revealed that it had taken the lead role in the Riley-Multimatic LMP2 programme, a departure from the initial shared lead, that had Riley leading the commercial aspects of the LMP2 programme, and Multimatic focusing on the DPi aspect of the programme.

GTLM and GT3

Riley developed the Mazda RX-8 chassis for SpeedSource, that won the GT class in the 2008 race.  Also unveiled in 2008 was the BMW M6 GT race car, and the GT2-class Chevrolet Corvette Riley built and raced in the 2008 American Le Mans Series. The car also raced at the 2009 Petit Le Mans, where it beat both Corvette Racing factory cars in qualifying.

In 2012, the SRT Viper debuted at the American Le Mans Series GT class, with drivers Dominik Farnbacher, Marc Goossens, Ryan Hunter-Reay, Tommy Kendall, Jonathan Bomarito and Kuno Wittmer. In the 2013 ALMS, the team finished 3rd in the GT class championship. The car made its debut at the Le Mans 24 Hours in 2013, where it finished eighth in class and 24th overall. In 2014, the team entered the IMSA SportsCar Championship GTLM class, winning the teams championship and driver's championship by Kuno Wittmer. Following the end of the 2014 season, Chrysler discontinued the factory program by SRT Motorsports.

The Viper GT3-R was also jointly developed by SRT Motorsports and Riley Technologies. It competed in the IMSA GTD class, the Pirelli World Challenge GT class, and Dutch Supercar Challenge Super GT class.

In 2017, Riley competed in the IMSA GTD class with two customer Mercedes-AMG GT GT3s. The #33 of Ben Keating and Jeroen Bleekemolen was runner-up in the teams championship, whereas the #50 of Cooper MacNeil and Gunnar Jeannette was 9th. In 2018, Keating and Bleekemolen drove a single Mercedes-AMG GT for Riley, placing third in points. In 2019, the duo finished 7th in the overall championship, and won the Endurance Cup.

Riley had Lawson Aschenbach and Gar Robinson as drivers of their single Mercedes-AMG GT for the 2020 IMSA WeatherTech Championship, resulting 7th in the GTD class overall standings.

Other racing
A derivative of the Riley Daytona Prototype chassis is also raced in the GT300 class of SuperGT as the Mooncraft Shiden.

In April 2008 Riley Technologies announced plans to build a track day car to meet the growing demand for high-performance vehicles for use at private track facilities.

Riley Technologies built the Chevrolet Camaro GS.R that competed in the Continental Tire Sports Car Challenge in the early 2010s.

In 2019, Riley entered the IMSA Michelin Pilot Challenge with a Mercedes-AMG GT4 with drivers Jim Cox and Dylan Murry, finishing 6th in points. The duo won the Daytona season opener with Jeroen Bleekemolen as third driver.

Cox and Murry will continue with Riley in 2021, but switching to the LMP3 class of the IMSA WeatherTech Championship.

References

External links
Riley Technologies website

2001 establishments in the United States
American racecar constructors
WeatherTech SportsCar Championship teams
Auto racing teams established in 2001
24 Hours of Le Mans teams